The eighty-second Minnesota Legislature first convened on January 3, 2001. The 67 members of the Minnesota Senate and the 134 members of the Minnesota House of Representatives were elected during the General Election on November 7, 2000.

Sessions 
The legislature met in a regular session from January 3, 2001 to May 21, 2001. A special session began on June 11, 2001 to consider taxes, the budget, and other bills not passed during the regular session.

A continuation of the regular session was held between January 29, 2002 and May 20, 2002. An additional special session was convened on September 19, 2002 to provide flood relief for Roseau and consider sales taxes and charitable deductions.

Party summary 
Resignations and new members are discussed in the "Membership changes" section, below.

Senate

House of Representatives

Leadership

Senate 
President of the Senate
Don Samuelson (DFL-Brainerd)

Senate Majority Leader
Roger Moe (DFL-Erskine)

Senate Minority Leader
Dick Day (R-Owatonna)

House of Representatives 
Speaker of the House
Steve Sviggum (R-Kenyon)

House Majority Leader
Tim Pawlenty (R-Eagen)

House Minority Leader
Tom Pugh (DFL-South St. Paul)

Members

Senate

House of Representatives

Membership changes

Senate

House of Representatives

Notes

References 

 Minnesota Legislators Past & Present - Session Search Results (Session 82, Senate)
 Minnesota Legislators Past & Present - Session Search Results (Session 82, House)

82nd
2000s in Minnesota
2001 in Minnesota
2002 in Minnesota
2001 U.S. legislative sessions
2002 U.S. legislative sessions